Timothy's Quest is a 1922 American silent drama film produced by Dirigo Films and distributed by American Releasing. It was directed by Sidney Olcott based on a story written by Kate Douglas Wiggin and starred the child actor Joseph Depew.

The Library of Congress has a copy of this film.

Cast
Joseph Depew as Timothy
Baby Helen Rowland as Lady Gay
Marie Day as Mrs. Avilda Cummins
Margaret Seddon as Samantha Ann Ripley
Bertram Marburgh as Jabe Slowcum
Vivia Ogden as Hitty Tarbox
Gladys Leslie as Miss Dora
William F. Haddock as Dave Milliken
Rags as The Dog

Production notes
The film was shot in Maine and in Tec-Art studio, 48th Street, New York City.

References

External links

American Film Institute Catalog

 Timothy's Quest on website dedicated to Sidney Olcott

1922 films
American silent feature films
Films directed by Sidney Olcott
1922 drama films
Silent American drama films
American black-and-white films
Films based on works by Kate Douglas Wiggin
1920s American films